1950 was the 51st season of County Championship cricket in England. England and West Indies played a memorable Test series which the visitors won 3–1. The championship was shared by Lancashire and Surrey.

Honours
County Championship – Lancashire and Surrey shared the title
Minor Counties Championship – Surrey II
Wisden Cricketers of the Year from 1951 edition of Wisden for deeds in the 1950 season – Godfrey Evans, Sonny Ramadhin, Alf Valentine, Everton Weekes, Frank Worrell

County Championship

Test series

West Indies tour

England lost the series 3–1 to John Goddard's West Indies who claimed four places in the Wisden Five Cricketers of the Year (see above). Not only was this the first time that West Indies had won a series in England, but they had never previously won a Test in the country. Ramadhin had match figures of 11–152 at Lord's, and his "spin twin" Valentine had figures of 11–204 at Old Trafford and 10–160 at The Oval.

Leading batsmen

Watson missed much of the season because he was in the England football team that contested the 1950 World Cup in Brazil.

Leading bowlers

References

Annual reviews
 Playfair Cricket Annual 1951
 Wisden Cricketers' Almanack 1951

External links
 CricketArchive – season summary

1950 in English cricket
English cricket seasons in the 20th century